Sergei Abramov (born July 10, 1956) is a Russian former professional ice hockey player who played 165 games in the Soviet Championship League for HC Izhstal. He is currently the head coach of HC Izhstal of the Russian Higher Hockey League.

Career statistics

References

1956 births
2019 deaths
HC Izhstal players
Russian ice hockey forwards
Sportspeople from Ufa